The list of ship decommissionings in 1899 includes a chronological list of all ships decommissioned in 1899.


References

See also 

1899
 Ship decommissionings